Christina Hambley Brown, Lady Evans  (born 21 November 1953), is an English journalist, magazine editor, columnist, broadcaster, and author. Born a British citizen, she now holds joint citizenship after she took United States citizenship in 2005, following her emigration in 1984 to edit Vanity Fair.

At the age of 25 she was appointed editor-in-chief of the British monthly Tatler and served from 1979 to 1982. From 1984 to 1992 she edited Vanity Fair and from 1992 to 1998 she was the first female editor of The New Yorker. She was founding editor-in-chief of The Daily Beast, serving from 2008 to 2013. From 1998 to 2002 she was chairman of Talk Media, which included Talk magazine and Talk Miramax Books.

From 2010 to 2020 she was CEO and founding editor of Women in the World, a live journalism platform to elevate the voices of global women, both celebrated and unknown.

She is author of The Diana Chronicles (2007) a biography of Diana, Princess of Wales, The Vanity Fair Diaries (2017) and New York Times Bestseller The Palace Papers (2022).

As a magazine editor, she has received four George Polk Awards, five Overseas Press Club awards, and ten National Magazine Awards, and in 2007 was inducted into the Magazine Editors' Hall of Fame. In 2021 she was honored as a Library Lion by the New York Public Library. In 2022, Women in Journalism, the UK's  leading networking and training organization for journalists, honored her with their Lifetime Achievement Award.

In 2000, she was appointed a CBE (Commander of the Order of the British Empire) for her services to journalism overseas, by HM Queen Elizabeth.

She was the CBS commentator with Norah O'Donnell, Gayle King, Julian Payne, and Wesley Kerr for the funeral of Queen Elizabeth II in September 2022.

In 2023, in partnership with Reuters and Durham University, she is hosting and producing Truth Tellers, the inaugural Sir Harry Evans Global Summit in Investigative Journalism at the RIBA, in honor of her late husband Sir Harold Evans, the celebrated former editor of The Sunday Times.

Early life and education
Tina Brown was born in Maidenhead, Berkshire, England, and grew up in the village of Little Marlow, in Buckinghamshire. Her father, George Hambley Brown, was active in the British film industry as a producer, including the Miss Marple films starring Margaret Rutherford. Her elder brother, Christopher Hambley Brown, became a film producer. Her mother, Bettina Kohr, who married George Brown in 1948, was an executive assistant to Laurence Olivier on his first two Shakespeare films. Bettina was of part Iraqi descent; Tina recounted, "She was dark and I never knew why."

In Brown's own words she was considered "an extremely subversive influence" as a child, resulting in her expulsion from three boarding schools. Offences included organising a demonstration to protest against the school's policy of allowing a change of underwear only three times a week, referring to her headmistress's bosoms as "unidentified flying objects" in a journal entry, and writing a play about her school being blown up and a public lavatory being erected in its place.

Brown entered the University of Oxford at the age of 17. She studied at St Anne's College, and graduated with a BA in English Literature. As an undergraduate, she wrote for Isis, the university's literary magazine, to which she contributed interviews with the journalist Auberon Waugh and the actor Dudley Moore. Brown wrote for the New Statesman while she was still an undergraduate at Oxford. An invitation by Waugh to a Private Eye lunch she wrote up irreverently caught the eye of the editor of The New Statesman Anthony Howard and he offered her an Oxford column.

While still at Oxford, she won The Sunday Times National Student Drama Award for her one-act play Under the Bamboo Tree which was performed at the Bush Theatre and The Edinburgh Festival. A subsequent play, Happy Yellow, in 1977 was mounted at the London fringe Bush Theatre and was later performed at the Royal Academy of Dramatic Art.

Personal life
In 1973, the literary agent Pat Kavanagh introduced Brown's writings to Harold Evans, editor of The Sunday Times, and in 1974 she was given freelance assignments in the UK by Ian Jack, the paper's features editor, and in the US by its colour magazine, edited by Godfrey Smith. When a relationship developed between Brown and Evans, she resigned to write for the rival The Sunday Telegraph. Evans divorced in 1978 and, on 20 August 1981, he and Brown married at Grey Gardens, the East Hampton, New York, home of The Washington Post executive editor Ben Bradlee and Sally Quinn. They lived together in New York City until Evans' death on 23 September 2020. They had two children: a son, Georgie, born in 1986, and a daughter, Isabel, born in 1990. Evans was knighted for his services to journalism in 2004.

Career

Punch
After graduating, while doing freelance reporting, Brown was invited to write a weekly column by the literary humour magazine, Punch. These articles and her freelance contributions to The Sunday Times and The Sunday Telegraph earned her the Catherine Pakenham Award for the best journalist under 25. Some of the writings from this era formed part of her first collection Loose Talk, published by Michael Joseph.

Tatler
In 1979, Brown was invited to edit the society magazine Tatler by its new owner, the Australian real estate millionaire Gary Bogard and turned it into a successful modern glossy magazine with covers by celebrated photographers like Norman Parkinson, Helmut Newton, and David Bailey, and fashion by Michael Roberts. Tatler featured writers from Brown's circle including Julian Barnes, Dennis Potter, Auberon Waugh, Brian Sewell, Martin Amis, Georgina Howell (whom Brown appointed deputy editor), and Nicholas Coleridge. She transformed the social coverage with pictures by her young discovery Dafydd Jones. Brown herself wrote content for every issue, contributing sharp surveys of the upper classes. She travelled through Scotland to portray the owners' stately homes for a feature titled North of the Border with the Thane of Cawdor. She also wrote short satirical profiles of eligible London bachelors under the pen-name Rosie Boot.

Tatler covered the emergence of Lady Diana Spencer, soon to become Princess of Wales. Brown joined NBC's Tom Brokaw in running commentary for The Today Show on the royal wedding on 29 July 1981. Tatler increased its sales from 10,000 to 40,000. In 1982, when S. I. ("Si") Newhouse Jr., owner of Condé Nast Publications, bought Tatler, Brown resigned to become a full-time writer again. The break didn't last long and Brown was lured back to Conde Nast. This year she also hosted several editions of the long running television series Film82 for BBC1 as a guest presenter.

Vanity Fair

In 1983, Brown was brought to New York by Newhouse to advise on Vanity Fair, a title that he had resurrected earlier that year. It then had a circulation of 200,000. She stayed on as a contributing editor for a brief time, and then was named editor-in-chief on 1 January 1984. She recalls that upon taking over the magazine she found it to be "pretentious, humourless. It wasn't too clever, it was just dull."

The first contract writer she hired was not a writer but a movie producer whom she met at a dinner party hosted by the writer Marie Brenner. The producer told her he was going to California for the trial of the strangler of his daughter. As solace, Brown suggested for him to keep a diary and his report (headlined Justice) proved the launch of the long magazine career of Dominick Dunne.

Early pieces such as Dunne's cover story on accused murderer Klaus Von Bulow and Los Angeles arrivistes like Candy Spelling, and the use of provocative covers transformed the prospects of the magazine. In addition, Brown signed up among others Marie Brenner, Gail Sheehy—who wrote a series of widely read political profiles including a cover story on Mikhail Gorbachev—Jesse Kornbluth, T.D. Allman, Stephen Schiff, Lynn Herschberg, Peter J. Boyer, John Richardson, James Atlas, Alex Shoumatoff and Ben Brantley. The magazine became a mix of celebrity and serious foreign and domestic reporting. Brown persuaded the novelist William Styron to write about his depression under the title Darkness Visible, which subsequently became a best-selling nonfiction book. At the same time, Brown formed fruitful relationships with photographers Annie Leibovitz, Harry Benson, Herb Ritts, and Helmut Newton. Annie Leibovitz's portrayal of Jerry Hall, Diane Keaton, Whoopi Goldberg and others came to define Vanity Fair. Its best known cover of this period was in August 1991 featuring a naked and pregnant Demi Moore.

Three stories appeared in Vanity Fair which helped the magazine gain attention and circulation: Harry Benson's cover shoot of Ronald and Nancy Reagan dancing in the White House; Helmut Newton's portrait of accused murderer Claus von Bülow in his leathers with his mistress Andrea Reynolds with reporting by Dominick Dunne, and Brown's own cover story on Diana, Princess of Wales in October 1985 titled The Mouse that Roared. Those three stories from June to October 1985 saved the magazine after a year when rumors were rife that it was to be folded into The New Yorker.

Thereafter sales of Vanity Fair rose from 200,000 to 1.2 million. In 1988, she was named Magazine Editor of the Year by Advertising Age magazine. Advertising topped 1,440 pages in 1991 and with circulation revenues, especially from profitable single copy sales at $20 million, selling some 55 percent of copies on the newsstand, well above the industry average sell through of 42 percent. Despite this success, occasional references later appeared to Vanity Fair losing money. Professor Jeffrey Pfeffer who suggested as much in his book Power: Why Some People Have It – And Others Don't was quickly rebutted by Bernard Leser, president of Conde Nast USA during Brown's tenure. In a letter to the editor of the Evening Standard, Leser stated Pfeffer's claim was "absolutely false" and affirmed that they had indeed earned "a very healthy profit." Leo Scullin, an independent magazine consultant, called it a "successful launch of a franchise." Under Brown's editorship Vanity Fair won four National Magazine Awards, including a 1989 award for General Excellence.

One of her editorial decisions was in October 1990, two months after the first Gulf War had started, when she removed a picture of Marla Maples (a blonde) from the cover and replaced it with a photograph of Cher. The reason for her last minute decision, she quipped to The Washington Post: "In light of the gulf crisis, we thought a brunette was more appropriate."

The New Yorker

In 1992, Brown accepted the company's invitation to become editor of The New Yorker, the fourth in its 73-year history and the first woman to hold the position, having been preceded by Harold Ross, William Shawn, and Robert Gottlieb. She has related in speeches that before taking over, she immersed herself in vintage New Yorkers, reading the issues produced by founding editor Harold Ross: "There was an irreverence, a lightness of touch as well as a literary voice that had been obscured in later years when the magazine became more celebrated and stuffy. ... Rekindling that DNA became my passion."

"The New Yorker is a text-driven magazine and always will be, and certainly will be under my tenure," she said in an early interview. Text, she added, was her "first love." Still, anxieties that Brown might change the identity of The New Yorker as a cultural institution prompted a number of resignations. George Trow, who had been with the magazine for almost three decades, accused Brown of "kissing the ass of celebrity" in his resignation letter. (To which Brown reportedly replied, "I am distraught at your defection but since you never actually write anything I should say I am notionally distraught.") The departing Jamaica Kincaid described Brown as "Stalin in high heels."

However, Brown had the support of some New Yorker stalwarts, including John Updike, Roger Angell, Brendan Gill, Lillian Ross, Calvin Tomkins, Janet Malcolm, Harold Brodkey and Philip Hamburger, as well as newer staffers like Adam Gopnik and Nancy Franklin. During her editorship, she let 79 staffers go and engaged 50 new writers and editors, most of whom remain to this day, including David Remnick (whom she nominated as her successor), Malcolm Gladwell, Anthony Lane, Jane Mayer, Jeffrey Toobin, Hendrik Hertzberg, Hilton Als, Ken Auletta, Simon Schama, Lawrence Wright, John Lahr, recently departed managing editor Pamela McCarthy and executive editor Dorothy Wickenden. Brown introduced the concept of special double issues such as the annual fiction issue and the Holiday Season cartoon issue. She also collaborated with Harvard professor Henry Louis Gates to devote a whole issue to the theme Black in America.

Brown broke the magazine's longstanding reluctance to treat photography seriously in 1992, when she invited Richard Avedon to be its first staff photographer. She also approved controversial covers from a new crop of artists, including Edward Sorel's October 1992 cover of a punk rock passenger sprawled in the backseat of an elegant horse-drawn carriage, which may have been Brown's self-mocking riposte to fears that she would downgrade the magazine. A year later a national controversy was provoked by her publication of Art Spiegelman's Valentine's Day cover of a Jewish man and a black woman in an embracing kiss, a comment on the mounting racial tensions between blacks and ultra-Orthodox Jews in the Crown Heights section of Brooklyn, New York. Brown appointed his wife Francoise Mouly as The New Yorker's art editor, a post she ocupies today.

During Brown's tenure, the magazine received four George Polk Awards, five Overseas Press Club Awards, and ten National Magazine Awards, including a 1995 award for General Excellence, the first in the magazine's history. Newsstand sales rose 145 percent. The New Yorkers circulation increased to 807,935 for the second half of 1997, up from 658,916 during the corresponding period in 1992. Critics maintained it was hemorrhaging money, but Newhouse remained supportive, viewing the magazine under Brown as a start-up (which routinely lose money): "It was practically a new magazine. She added topicality, photography, color. She did what we would have done if we invented the New Yorker from scratch. To do all that was costly. We knew it would be." Under Brown, its economic fortunes improved every year: in 1995 losses were about $17 million, in 1996 $14 million, and in 1997 $11 million.

In 1998, Brown resigned from The New Yorker following an invitation from Harvey and Bob Weinstein of Miramax Films (then owned by The Walt Disney Company) to be the chairman of a new multi-media company they intended to start with a new magazine, book company, and television show. The Hearst company came in as partners with Miramax.

The departing verdicts after Brown's New Yorker tenure included:

Talk magazine
In 1998 Brown resigned from The New Yorker following an invitation from Harvey and Bob Weinstein of Miramax Films (then owned by The Walt Disbey Company) to be the chairman of a new multi-media company. Talk Media was founded in July 1998 by Miramax Films, Tina Brown and Ron Galotti to publish books, Talk magazine and the mission to produce movies and television programs from its content.

Talk Media formed a joint venture with Hearst Magazines for the magazine only in February 1999. Brown worked with the book division's editor-in-chief Jonathan Burnham and acquiring editor Susan Mercandetti. She recalled in October 2017 at the time of allegations of sexual assault being made against Harvey Weinstein: "Strange contracts pre-dating us would suddenly surface, book deals with no deadline attache authored by attractive or nearly famous women."

Simultaneously Tina Brown created Talk magazine, a monthly compendium of news and culture. Staff members included editors Sam Sifton, Danielle Mattoon, Jonathan Mahler and Virginia Hefferman. Its two political columnists were Jake Tapper and Tucker Carlson. Three significant Talk pieces were the first US profile of Osama Bin Laden before 9/11, Tom Stoppard's autobiographical piece about his Jewish roots that was the origin of his 2020 play Leopoldstadt and Tucker Carlson's revealing profile of then Republican presidential candidate George W Bush.

Talk magazine was due to be launched during a party at the Brooklyn Navy Yard in New York City but was banned by Mayor Rudy Giuliani, who did not feel it was an appropriate use of the site. The star-studded event mixing political leaders, writers, and Hollywood, was then moved to Liberty Island, where on 2 August 1999 more than 800 guests – including Madonna, Salman Rushdie, Demi Moore, and George Plimpton - arrived by barge for a picnic dinner at the feet of the Statue of Liberty under thousands of Japanese lanterns and a Grucci fireworks display. An interview with Hillary Clinton in its first issue caused an immediate political sensation when she claimed that the abuse her husband suffered as a child led to his adult philandering. The Washington Post reported that at times, "Talk seemed more interested in promoting such Miramax stars as Gwyneth Paltrow than in politics."

Despite having achieved a circulation of 670,000 Talk magazine's publication was abruptly halted in January 2002 in the wake of the advertising recession following the 9/11 attacks. It was Brown's first very public failure but she said she had no regrets about embarking on the project. She told Charlotte Edwardes of The Telegraph in 2002: "My reputation rests on four magazines – three great successes, one that was a great experiment. I don't feel in any way let down. No big career doesn't have one flame out in it and there's nobody more boring than the undefeated." Talk Media was founded in July 1998 by Miramax Films, Tina Brown and Ron Galotti to publish books and Talk magazine and produce television programs. Talk Media formed a joint venture with Hearst Magazines for the magazine only in February 1999. Brown worked with the book division's editor-in chief Jonathan Burnham. She recalled in October 2017 at the time of allegations of sexual assault being made against Harvey Weinstein: "Strange contracts pre-dating us would suddenly surface, book deals with no deadline attached authored by attractive or nearly famous women."

Politico estimated that Brown had "bombed through some $50 million in 2 years" on the failed venture, but that assessment did not include revenue from the book division. Talk Miramax Books flourished as a boutique publishing house until it was detached from Miramax in 2005 and made part of Hyperion at Disney. Out of 42 books published during Brown's time, 11 appeared on the New York Times Best Seller List, including Leadership by Rudy Giuliani, Leap of Faith by Queen Noor of Jordan, Stolen Lives by Malika Oufkir, Experience by Martin Amis and Madam Secretary by Madeleine Albright.

A $1 million contract settlement in 2002 ended Brown's involvement in Talk Media.

Topic A
Brown hosted a series of specials for CNBC. The network followed up by signing her to host a weekly Sunday evening talk show of politics and culture titled Topic [A] With Tina Brown, which debuted on 4 May 2003. The program welcomed guests ranging from political figures, such as the Prime Minister of the UK, Tony Blair, and Senator John McCain, to celebrities, such as George Clooney and Annette Bening. Airing after a day of infomercials, Topic A struggled to find an audience on Sunday nights. It averaged 75,000 viewers in 2005, about the same as The Big Idea with Donny Deutsch (79,000) and John McEnroe's McEnroe (75,000.) On being offered a lucrative deal with tight deadlines to write a book about Princess Diana, Brown resigned, airing her last Topic A interviews on 29 May 2005.

Books

Brown's biography of Diana, Princess of Wales was published just before the 10th anniversary of her death in June 2007. The Diana Chronicles made The New York Times bestseller list for hardback nonfiction, with two weeks in the number one position.

In 2017, Brown published The Vanity Fair Diaries, culled from her eight and a half years as editor-in-chief of Vanity Fair. 

In 2022, Brown published a sequel to The Diana Chronicles, called The Palace Papers: Inside the House of Windsor–The Truth and the Turmoil, on the period between the deaths of the Princess of Wales and Queen Elizabeth II. 

"[Brown] becomes the ideal tour guide: witty, opinionated and adept at moving us smoothly from bedchamber to below stairs while offering side trips to the cesspits of the tabloid press, the striving world of second-tier celebrities and the threadbare lodgings of palace supernumeraries", reads the Wall Street Journal review.

"Some of the gossip", wrote Philip Hensher in a review for The Spectator, as in "all books of this sort, is grossly implausible."

The Daily Beast

On 6 October 2008, Brown teamed up with Barry Diller to launch The Daily Beast, an online news site. The site immediately took off after Republican scion of William F. Buckley, Christopher Buckley, posted a column saying he was switching his vote to Barack Obama. Other newsmaking pieces included Lucinda Franks' coverage of the Bernie Madoff case. Regular Beast contributors included John Avlon, former CIA station chief Bruce Reidel, former Council on Foreign Relations President Emeritus Leslie Gelb, and Michelle Goldberg.

The Daily Beast won the Webby Award for Best News Site in 2012 and 2013.

On 12 November 2010, The Daily Beast and Newsweek announced that they would merge their operations in a joint venture to be owned equally by Sidney Harman and IAC/InterActiveCorp. The new entity was named The Newsweek Daily Beast Company with Tina Brown as Editor-in-Chief and Stephen Colvin as CEO. In December 2012, the final printed issue of Newsweek was published. A cover headline stated the magazine would change to the digital format, and Tina Brown wrote an editorial about it. The digital format was short-lived: the print edition returned after Brown's departure.

On 11 September 2013, Editor-in-Chief Tina Brown announced her departure. Initial reports of her contract not being renewed were refuted in a statement issued by Barry Diller, IAC/InterActiveCorp's Executive Director:

Brown's resignation caused much speculation in the media in regard to the future of the website. Her hand-picked successor as executive editor, John Avlon, addressed the question succinctly with his quip: "The Daily Beast roars on."

Women in the World 
Women in the World was a live journalism platform that was produced from 2010 to 2020, founded by Tina Brown to 'discover and amplify the unheard voices of global women on the front lines of change,'

First held at New York’s Hudson Theater, and thereafter at Lincoln Center’s David Koch Theater, the summit convened women leaders, activists and political change-makers from around the world to share their stories and offer solutions to building a better life for women and girls. Former ABC news producer Kyle Gibson was senior executive producer and managing editor of the event.

The inaugural summit took place from March 12–14, 2010, and included appearances by Queen Rania of Jordan, Meryl Streep, Valerie Jarrett, Christine Lagarde, Hillary Clinton, Madeleine K. Albright, Nora Ephron, and Katie Couric. At the second summit, held from March 10–12, 2011, participants included Hillary Clinton, Dr. Hawa Abdi, Condoleezza Rice, Sheryl Sandberg, Dr. Ngozi Okonjo-Iweala, Diane Von Furstenberg, Melinda Gates, Ashley Judd and more.

The three-day summit at Lincoln Center was attended annually by more than 2,500 ticket buyers. Other featured guests included Angelina Jolie, Oprah Winfrey, Nobel Peace Prize laureate Maria Ressa, Nobel Peace Prize laureate Leymah Gbowee, Barbra Streisand, Nancy Pelosi, Gloria Steinem, Zainab Salbi, Christiane Amanpour, Justin Trudeau, Masih Alinejad, Nikki Haley, Lynsey Addario, Cecile Richards, Priyanka Chopra, Melinda Gates, Chimanada Ngozi Adiche, Nicholas Kristof, Ajay Banga and Anna Wintour.

"Progress, one conference at a time... Women in the World, which features women from diverse cultures and backgrounds, brings in celebrities, media stars and fashion figures. Since it started in 2010, it has leaped to the forefront of the scene, drawing thousands of chief executives, world leaders, artists and activists to a tightly packed program at Lincoln Center," wrote Luisita Lopez Torregrosa in the New York Times.

In 2012, Women in the World expanded outside of the U.S. with a summit held in São Paulo, Brazil. Between 2012 and 2019 Women in the World hosted summits and salons in New Delhi, Toronto, London and Dubai, as well as Washington DC, San Antonio Texas, Dallas, Los Angeles and Miami.

Beginning with the 2012 summit, Toyota and Women in the World partnered for the “Mothers of Invention” series. Honorees included: Asenath Andrews of the Catherine Ferguson Academy, Talia Leman of RandomKid.org, and Jessica Matthews and Julia Silverman of sOccket. In 2013, honorees included Kavita M. Shukla of FreshPaper, Sejal Hathi and Tara Roberts of Girltank, and Caitria and Morgan O’Neill of Recovers.org. In January 2014, Toyota and Women in the World announced Anna Stork and Andrea Sreshta, co-founders of the LuminAid, as the first of three 2014 Mothers of Invention honorees.

Other partners included Mastercard, AT&T and Bank of America.

The Women in the World Summit was closed down by the Covid-19 pandemic of 2020.

Works
 
collection of articles for Tatler
 
collection of articles for Tatler

Awards and honors 

 10 National Magazine Awards
 4 George Polk Awards
 5 Overseas Press Club Awards
 2000: Apointed a CBE (Commander of the Order of the British Empire) for her services to journalism overseas, by HM Queen Elizabeth II
 2007: Inducted into the American Magazine Editor's Hall of Fame.
 2021: Honored as Library Lion by the New York Public Library.
 2022: Women in Journalism Lifetime Achievement Award

References

Sources

External links
 Official Random House biography
 
 
 
 

1953 births
Alumni of St Anne's College, Oxford
Living people
English journalists
English magazine editors
English emigrants to the United States
People from Maidenhead
People from East Hampton (town), New York
The New Yorker editors
The New York Sun people
Talk (magazine) people
Vanity Fair (magazine) editors
The Washington Post people
English women journalists
English people of Iraqi descent
Women magazine editors
Wives of knights